Kwak Jung-wook (born 12 June 1990) is a South Korean actor.

Personal life 
On January 24, 2022, it was confirmed that Kwak and Park Se-young are getting married in mid-February, and the wedding ceremony would be held privately in Seoul. They met during the filming of drama School 2013, and developed into a couple a few years ago.

Filmography

Television series

Film

Awards and nominations

References

External links 
 
 
 

1990 births
Living people
South Korean male television actors
South Korean male film actors
Sungkyunkwan University alumni